The Soviet Union (USSR) competed at the 1976 Summer Olympics in the city of Montreal, Quebec, Canada. 410 competitors, 285 men and 125 women, took part in 189 events in 22 sports. As the country hosted the next Olympics in Moscow, a Soviet segment was performed at the closing ceremony.

Medalists

Gold
 Nikolai Andrianov — artistic gymnastics, men's floor exercise
 Nellie Kim — artistic gymnastics, women's floor exercise
 Nikolai Andrianov — artistic gymnastics, men's individual all-round
 Nikolai Andrianov — artistic gymnastics, men's rings
 Svetlana Grozdova, Elvira Saadi, Maria Filatova, Olga Korbut, Ludmilla Tourischeva and Nellie Kim — artistic gymnastics, women's team competition
 Nikolai Andrianov — artistic gymnastics, men's vault
 Nellie Kim — artistic gymnastics, women's vault
 Viktor Saneyev — athletics, men's triple jump
 Yuri Sedykh — athletics, men's hammer throw
 Tatyana Kazankina — athletics, women's 800m
 Tatyana Kazankina — athletics, women's 1500m
 Angele Rupshene, Tatjana Zakharova, Raisa Kurvyakova, Olga Barisheva, Tatjana Ovetchkina, Nadezhda Shuvaeva, Uljana Semjonova, Nadezhda Zakharova, Nelli Feryabnikova, Olga Sukharnova, Tamara Daunene and Natalia Klimova — basketball, women's team competition
 Aleksandr Rogov — canoeing, men's C1 500m
 Sergei Petrenko and Aleksandr Vinogradov — canoeing, men's C2 500m
 Sergei Petrenko and Aleksandr Vinogradov — canoeing, men's C2 1000m
 Sergei Nagornyi and Vladimir Romanovsky — canoeing, men's K2 1000m
 Sergei Chukhrai, Aleksandr Degtyarev, Yuri Filatov and Vladimir Morozov — canoeing, men's K4 1000m
 Nina Gopova and Galina Kreft — canoeing, women's K2 500m
 Anatoli Chukanov, Valeri Chaplygin, Vladimir Kaminsky and Aavo Pikkuus —  cycling road, men's team time trial
 Elena Vaytsekhovskaya — diving, women's 10m platform
 Elena Novikova-Belova, Olga Knyazeva, Valentina Sidorova, Nailia Giliazova and Valentina Nikonova — fencing, women's foil team
 Viktor Krovopuskov — fencing, men's sabre individual
 Viktor Krovopuskov, Eduard Vinokurov, Viktor Sidyak, Vladimir Nazlymov and Mikhail Burtsev — fencing, men's sabre team
 Aleksandr Resanov, Nikolay Tomin, Sergey Kushniryuk, Jury Lagutin, Vladimir Maksimov, Jury Kidyaev, Jury Klimov, Vladimir Kravtsov, Valery Gassy, Vasily Ilyin, Mikhail Ishchenko, Aleksandr Anpilogov, Yevgeni Chernyshov and Anatoly Fedyukin — handball, men's team competition
 Natalya Timoshkina-Sherstyuk, Zinaida Turchina, Halyna Zakharova, Rafiga Shabanova, Lyudmila Shubina, Lyubov Odinokova-Berezhnaya, Lyudmila Panchuk, Lyudmila Poradnik-Bobrus, Mariya Litoshenko, Nina Lobova, Aldona Neneniene-Cesaitìte, Tatyana Glushchenko, Larisa Karlova and Tatyana Kotchergina-Makarets — handball, women's team competition
 Sergei Novikov — judo, men's heavyweight
 Vladimir Nevzorov — judo, men's half-middleweight
 Vladimir Eshinov, Nikolay Ivanov, Mikhail Kuznetsov, Aleksandr Klepikov, Aleksandr Lukyanov (cox), and Aleksandr Sema — rowing, men's four-oared shell with coxswain
 Aleksandr Gazov — shooting, men's running game target
 Marina Kosheveya — swimming, women's 200m breaststroke
 Aleksandr Voronin — weightlifting, men's flyweight
 Nikolay Kolesnikov — weightlifting, men's featherweight
 Pyotr Korol — weightlifting, men's lightweight
 Valery Shary — weightlifting, men's light heavyweight
 David Rigert — weightlifting, men's middle heavyweight
 Yury Zaytsev — weightlifting, men's heavyweight
 Vasily Alekseyev — weightlifting, men's super heavyweight
 Aleksey Shumakov — wrestling, men's Greco-Roman light flyweight
 Vitaly Konstantinov — wrestling, men's Greco-Roman flyweight
 Suren Nalbandyan — wrestling, men's Greco-Roman lightweight
 Anatoly Bykov — wrestling, men's Greco-Roman welterweight
 Valery Rezantsev — wrestling, men's Greco-Roman light heavyweight
 Nikolay Balboshin — wrestling, men's Greco-Roman heavyweight 
 Aleksandr Kolchinsky — wrestling, men's Greco-Roman super heavyweight
 Vladimir Yumin — wrestling, men's freestyle bantamweight
 Pavel Pynigyn — wrestling, men's freestyle lightweight
 Levan Tediashvili — wrestling, men's freestyle light heavyweight
 Ivan Yarygin — wrestling, men's freestyle heavyweight
 Soslan Andiyev — wrestling, men's freestyle super heavyweight

Silver
 Valentyna Kovpan — archery, women's individual competition
 Olga Korbut — artistic gymnastics, women's balance beam
 Vladimir Marchenko — artistic gymnastics, men's floor exercise
 Ludmilla Tourischeva — artistic gymnastics, women's floor exercise
 Nellie Kim — artistic gymnastics, women's individual all-around
 Nikolai Andrianov — artistic gymnastics, men's parallel bars
 Alexander Dityatin — artistic gymnastics, men's rings
 Vladimir Tikhonov, Gennady Krysin, Vladimir Marchenko, Alexander Dityatin, Vladimir Markelov and Nikolai Andrianov — artistic gymnastics, men's team competition
 Ludmilla Tourischeva — artistic gymnastics, women's vault
 Yevgeny Mironov — athletics, men's shot tut
 Aleksey Spiridonov — athletics, men's hammer throw
 Tatyana Anisimova — athletics, women's 100m hurdles
 Nadezhda Chizhova — athletics, women's shot put
 Rufat Riskiev — boxing, men's 71–75 kg
 Vasili Yurchenko — canoeing, men's C-1 1000m
 Tatyana Korshunova — canoeing, women's K-1 500m
 Sergei Nagornyi, Vladimir Romanovsky — canoeing, men's K-2 500m
 Vladimir Osokin, Aleksandr Perov, Vitali Petrakov and Viktor Sokolov — cycling, men's team pursuit
 Aleksander Romankov — fencing, men's foil individual
 Vladimir Nazlymov — fencing, men's sabre individual
 Valeri Dvoinikov — judo, men's middleweight
 Ramaz Kharshiladze — judo, men's half-heavyweight
 Pavel Lednev — modern pentathlon, men's individual competition
 Lyubov Talalaeva, Nadezhda Roshchina, Klavdiya Kozenkova, Elena Zubko, Olga Kolkova, Nelli Tarakanova, Nadezhda Rozgon, Olga Guzenko and Olga Pugovskaya — rowing, women's eight with coxswain
 Dmitri Bekhterev, Yuri Shurkalov and Yuri Lorentson — rowing, men's pair-oared shell with coxswain
 Anna Kondrashina, Mira Bryunina, Larissa Alexandrova-Popova, Galina Ermolaeva and Nadezhda Chernyshyova — rowing, women's quadruple sculls with coxswain
 Yevgeniy Duleyev, Yuriy Yakimov, Aivar Lazdenieks and Vytautas Butkus — rowing, men's quadruple sculls without coxswain
 Andrey Balashov — sailing, men's Finn
 Vladislav Akimenko and Valentyn Mankin — sailing, men's tempest
 Aleksandr Kedyarov — shooting, men's running game target
 Andrey Bogdanov, Sergey Kopliakov, Andrey Krylov and Vladimir Raskatov — swimming, men's 4 × 200 m freestyle relay
 Lyubov Rusanova — swimming, women's 100m breaststroke
 Marina Yurchenya — swimming, women's 200m breaststroke
 Aleksandr Yermilov, Vyacheslav Zaytsev, Yury Starunsky, Vladimir Ulanov, Anatoly Polishchuk, Aleksandr Savin, Pavel Selivanov, Vladimir Kondra, Oleg Moliboga, Vladimir Chernyshov, Yefim Chulak and Vladimir Dorokhov — volleyball, men's team competition
 Zoya Yusova, Inna Ryskal, Lyudmila Shchetinina, Nina Smoleyeva, Liliya Osadchaya, Anna Rostova, Lyubov Rudovskaya, Olga Kozakova, Natalya Kushnir, Nina Muradyan, Larisa Bergen and Lyudmila Chernyshova — volleyball, women's team competition
 Vardan Militosyan — weightlifting, men's middleweight
 Nelson Davidyan — wrestling, men's Greco-Roman featherweight
 Vladimir Cheboksarov — wrestling, men's Greco-Roman middleweight
 Roman Dimitriyev — wrestling, men's freestyle light flyweight
 Aleksandr Ivanov — wrestling, men's freestyle flyweight
 Viktor Novozhilov — wrestling, men's freestyle middleweight

Bronze
 Zebiniso Rustamova — archery, women's individual competition
 Ludmilla Tourischeva — artistic gymnastics, women's individual all-around
 Nikolai Andrianov — artistic gymnastics, men's pommel horse
 Valeriy Borzov — athletics, men's 100m
 Yevgeniy Gavrilenko — athletics, men's 400m hurdles
 Aleksandr Aksinin, Valeriy Borzov, Nikolay Kolesnikov and Juris Silovs — athletics, men's 4 × 100 m relay
 Alexandr Baryshnikov — athletics, men's shot put men
 Mykola Avilov — athletics, men's decathlon
 Anatoliy Bondarchuk — athletics, men's hammer throw
 Natalya Lebedeva — athletics, women's 100m hurdles
 Vera Anisimova, Nadezhda Besfamilnaya, Lyudmila Maslakova and Tatyana Prorochenko — athletics, women's 4 × 100 m relay
 Lyudmila Aksyonova, Nadezhda Ilyina, Inta Kļimoviča and Natalya Sokolova — athletics, women's 4 × 400 m relay
 Lidiya Alfeyeva — athletics, women's long jump
 Alzhan Zharmukhamedov, Vladimir Zhigily, Vladimir Tkachenko, Valery Miloserdov, Anatoly Myshkin, Aleksandr Salnikov, Ivan Edeshko, Mikheil Korkia, Andrey Makeyev, Vladimir Arzamaskov, Aleksandr Belov and Sergey Belov — basketball, men's team competition
 David Torosyan — boxing, men's flyweight
 Viktor Rybakov — boxing, men's bantamweight
 Vasily Solomin — boxing, men's lightweight
 Viktor Savchenko — boxing, men's light middleweight
 Vladimir Aleynik — diving, men's 10m platform
 Aleksandr Kosenkov — diving, men's 3m springboard
 Elena Novikova-Belova — fencing, women's foil individual
 Viktor Sidyak — fencing, men's sabre individual
 Vladimir Troshkin, David Kipiani, Vladimir Veremeyev, Viktor Zvyagintsev, Leonid Nazarenko, Vladimir Onishchenko, Stefan Reshko, Anatoly Konkov, Viktor Matviyenko, Aleksandr Minayev, Mikhail Fomenko, Vladimir Fyodorov, Viktor Kolotov, Vladimir Astapovsky, Oleg Blokhin, Aleksandr Prokhorov and Leonid Buryak — football (soccer), men's team competition
 Shota Chochishvili — judo, men's open category
 Eleonora Kaminskaitė, Genovaitė Ramoškienė — rowing, women's double sculls
 Raul Arnemann, Nikolai Kuznetsov, Valeriy Dolinin and Anushavan Gasan-Dzhalalov — rowing, men's four without coxswain
 Nadezhda Sevostyanova, Lyudmila Krokhina, Galina Mishenina, Anna Pasokha and Lidiya Krylova — rowing, women's four-oared shell with coxswain
 Elena Antonova — rowing, women's single sculls
 Gennady Lushchikov — shooting, men's small-bore rifle, prone
 Vladimir Raskatov — swimming, men's 400m freestyle
 Arvydas Juozaitis — swimming, men's 100 m breaststroke
 Marina Kosheveya — swimming, women's 100m breaststroke
 Lyubov Rusanova — swimming, women's 200m breaststroke
 Andrey Smirnov — swimming, men's 400m individual medley
 Farhat Mustafin — wrestling, men's Greco-Roman bantamweight

Archery

Women's individual competition:
 Valentina Kovpan — 2460 points (→  Silver medal)
 Zebiniso Rustamova — 2407 points (→  Bronze medal)

Men's individual competition:
 Vladimir Chendarov — 2467 points (→ 5th place)

Athletics

Men's 800 metres
 Viktor Anohin
 Heat — 1:46.81 (→ did not advance)

Men's 4x100 metres relay
 Aleksandr Aksinin, Nikolay Kolesnikov, Juris Silovs and Valeriy Borzov
 Heat — 39.98
 Semifinal — 39.36
 Final — 38.78s (→  Bronze medal)

Men's 4x400 metres relay
 Dmitriy Stukalov, Vladimir Ponomaryov, Viktor Anohin and Yevgeniy Gavrilenko
 Heat — 3:07.72 (→ did not advance)

Men's marathon
 Leonid Moseyev — 2:13:22 (→ 7th place)
 Alexander Gotskiy — 2:15:34 (→ 9th place)
 Yuriy Velikorodnyh — 2:19:45 (→ 24th place)

Men's 400m hurdles
 Yevgeniy Gavrilenko
 Heat — 50.93s
 Semifinal — 49.73s
 Final — 49.45s (→  Bronze medal)
 Dmitriy Stukalov
 Heat — 50.78s
 Semifinal — 50.47s (→ did not advance)

Men's long jump
 Valeriy Podlujnyi
 Qualification — 7.90m
 Final — 7.88m (→ 7th place)
 Aleksey Pereverzev
 Qualification — 7.78m
 Final — 7.66m (→ 10th place)
 Tõnu Lepik
 Qualification — 7.49m (→ did not advance)

Men's high jump
 Sergey Budalov
 Qualification — 2.16m
 Final — 2.21m (→ 4th place)
 Sergey Senyukov
 Qualification — 2.16m
 Final — 2.18m (→ 5th place)

Men's discus throw
 Nikolay Vikhor
 Qualification — 57.50m (→ did not advance, 21st place)

Men's 20 km race walk
 Vladimir Golubnichiy — 1:29:24 (→ 7th place)
 Oto Barch — 1:31:12 (→ 13th place)
 Viktor Semenov — 1:31:59 (→ 15th place)

Women's shot put
 Nadezhda Chizhova
Final — 20.96 m (→  Silver medal)
 Svetlana Krachevskaya
Final — 18.36 m (→ 9th place)
 Faina Melnik
Final — 18.07 m (→ 10th place)

Women's javelin throw
 Svetlana Babich
 Qualifying round — 56.82 m
 Final — 59.42 m (→ 6th place)

Basketball

Men's team competition
 Preliminary round (group A):
 Defeated Mexico (120–77)
 Defeated Australia (93–77)
 Defeated Canada (108–85)
 Defeated Japan (123–69)
 Defeated Cuba (98–72)
 Semifinals:
 Lost to Yugoslavia (84–89)
 Bronze medal match:
 Defeated Canada (100–72) →  Bronze medal
 Team roster
Vladimir Arzamaskov
Aleksandr Salnikov
Valery Miloserdov
Alzhan Zharmukhamedov
Andrei Makeev
Ivan Edeshko
Sergei Belov
Vladimir Tkachenko
Anatoly Myshkin
Mikheil Korkia
Aleksandr Belov
Vladimir Zhigily
 Head coach: Vladimir Kondrashin

Women's team competition
 Team roster
Angelė Rupšienė
Tatiana Zakharova-Nadirova
Raisa Kurvyakova
Olga Barisheva
Tatiana Ovechkina
Nadezhda Shuvayena
Uljana Semjonova
Nadezhda Zakharova
Nelly Feriabnikova
Olga Sukharnova
Tamara Dauinene
Natalya Kilmova
 Head coach: Lydia Alexeeva

Boxing

Men's light flyweight (– 48 kg)
 Aleksandr Tkachenko
 First round — defeated Eleoncio Mercedes (DOM), RSC-1
 Second round — lost to Payao Pooltarat (THA), 2:3

Men's flyweight (– 51 kg)
 David Torosyan
 First round — bye
 Second round — defeated Hassen Sheriff (ETH), walkover
 Third round — defeated Giovanni Camputaro (ITA), RSC-2
 Quarterfinal — defeated Jong Jo-Ung (PRK), 5:0
 Semifinal — lost to Ramón Duvalón (CUB), DSQ-2 →  Bronze Medal

Canoeing

Cycling

Twelve cyclists represented the Soviet Union in 1976.

Individual road race
 Nikolay Gorelov — 4:47:23 (→ 5th place)
 Aleksandr Averin — 4:49:01 (→ 17th place)
 Valery Chaplygin — 4:49:01 (→ 39th place)
 Aavo Pikkuus — 4:54:49 (→ 44th place)

Team time trial
 Anatoly Chukanov
 Valery Chaplygin
 Vladimir Kaminsky
 Aavo Pikkuus

Sprint
 Sergey Kravtsov — 7th place

1000m time trial
 Eduard Rapp — DSQ (→ 30th place)

Individual pursuit
 Vladimir Osokin — 4th place

Team pursuit
 Vladimir Osokin
 Aleksandr Perov
 Vitaly Petrakov
 Viktor Sokolov

Diving

Equestrian

Fencing

18 fencers, 13 men and 5 women, represented the Soviet Union in 1976. They finished top of the fencing medal table with a total of seven medals, including three gold and a clean-sweep in the individual men's sabre event.

Men's foil
 Aleksandr Romankov
 Vasyl Stankovych
 Vladimir Denisov

Men's team foil
 Sabirzhan Ruziyev, Aleksandr Romankov, Vladimir Denisov, Vasyl Stankovych

Men's épée
 Boris Lukomsky
 Aleksandr Bykov
 Aleksandr Abushakhmetov

Men's team épée
 Aleksandr Abushakhmetov, Viktor Modzalevsky, Vasyl Stankovych, Aleksandr Bykov, Boris Lukomsky

Men's sabre
 Viktor Krovopuskov
 Vladimir Nazlymov
 Viktor Sidyak

Men's team sabre
 Viktor Sidyak, Vladimir Nazlymov, Viktor Krovopuskov, Mikhail Burtsev, Eduard Vinokurov

Women's foil
 Yelena Novikova-Belova
 Valentina Sidorova
 Olga Knyazeva

Women's team foil
 Yelena Novikova-Belova, Valentina Sidorova, Olga Knyazeva, Nailya Gilyazova, Valentina Nikonova

Football

Gymnastics

Handball

Judo

Modern pentathlon

Three male pentathletes represented the Soviet Union in 1976. Pavel Lednyov won a silver medal in the individual event.

Individual
 Pavel Lednyov
 Boris Mosolov
 Borys Onyshchenko

Team
 Pavel Lednyov
 Boris Mosolov
 Borys Onyshchenko

Rowing

The Soviet Union had 31 male and 24 female rowers participate in all 14 rowing events in 1976.

Men’s competition
 Men's single sculls
 Mykola Dovhan

 Men's double sculls
 Evgeni Barbakov
 Gennadi Korshikov

 Men's coxless pair
 Gennadi Kinko
 Tiit Helmja

 Men's coxed pair
 Dmitry Bekhterev
 Yuriy Shurkalov
 Yuriy Lorentsson (cox)

 Men's quadruple sculls
 Yevgeniy Duleyev
 Yuriy Yakimov
 Aivars Lazdenieks
 Vytautas Butkus

 Men's coxless four
 Raul Arnemann
 Nikolay Kuznetsov
 Valeriy Dolinin
 Anushavan Gassan-Dzhalalov

 Men's coxed four
 Vladimir Eshinov
 Nikolay Ivanov (rower)
 Mikhail Kuznetsov (semi-final and final)
 Aleksandr Klepikov
 Aleksandr Lukyanov (cox)
 Aleksandr Sema (heat 1)

 Men's eight
 Aleksandr Shitov
 Antanas Čikotas
 Vasily Potapov
 Aleksandr Plyushkin
 Anatoly Nemtyryov
 Igor Konnov
 Anatoly Ivanov
 Vladimir Vasilyev
 Vladimir Zharov (cox)

Women's competition
 Women's single sculls
 Yelena Antonova

 Women's double sculls
 Eleonora Kaminskaitė
 Genovaitė Ramoškienė

 Women's coxless pair
 Nataliya Horodilova
 Hanna Karnaushenko

 Women's coxed four
 Nadezhda Sevostyanova
 Lyudmila Krokhina
 Galina Mishenina
 Anna Pasokha
 Lidiya Krylova (cox)

 Women's quadruple sculls
 Anna Kondrachina
 Mira Bryunina
 Larisa Popova
 Galina Yermolayeva
 Nadezhda Chernyshyova (cox)

 Women's eight
 Lyubov Talalaeva
 Nadezhda Roshchina
 Klavdija Koženkova
 Olena Zubko
 Olha Kolkova
 Nelli Tarakanova
 Nadiya Rozhon
 Olha Huzenko
 Olha Puhovska (cox)

Sailing

Shooting

Swimming

Volleyball

Men's team competition
 Preliminary round (group B)
 Defeated Italy (3–0)
 Defeated Brazil (3–0)
 Defeated Japan (3–0)
 Semifinals
 Defeated Cuba (3–0)
 Final
 Lost to Poland (2–3) →  Silver medal
 Team roster
Anatoly Polyshuk
Vyaschelav Zaitsev
Efim Chulak
Vladimir Dorohov
Aleksandr Ermilov
Pavel Selivanov
Oleg Moliboga
Vladimir Kondra
Yuri Starunski
Vladimir Chernyshev
Vladimir Ulanov
Aleksandr Savin
Yuri Chesnokov
 Head coach: Yuri Chesnokov

Women's team competition
 Preliminary round (Group B)
 Defeated South Korea (3–1)
 Defeated Cuba (3–1)
 Defeated East Germany (3–2)
 Semifinals
 Defeated Hungary (3–0)
 Final
 Lost to Japan (0–3) →  Silver medal
 Team roster
Anna Rostova
Lyudmila Shetinina
Lilia Osadchaya
Natalya Kushnyr
Olga Kozakova
Nina Smoleeva
Ljubov Rudovskaya
Larissa Bergen
Inna Ryskal
Lyudmila Chernysheva
Zoya Ilusova
Nina Muradyan
 Head coach: Givi Ahvlediani

Water polo

Men's team competition
 Team roster
Aleksey Barkalov
Aleksandr Dolgushin
Aleksandr Dreval
Aleksandr Kabanov
Aleksandr Zakharov
Anatoly Klebanov
Nikolay Melnikov
Nugzar Mshvenyeradze
Sergey Kotenko
Vitaly Romanchuk
Vladimir Iselidze
 Head coach: Anatoly Blumental

Weightlifting

Wrestling

Medals by republic
In the following table for team events number of team representatives, who received medals are counted, not "one medal for all the team", as usual. Because there were people from different republics in one team.

Top 5 sports societies
In the following table for team events number of team representatives, who received medals are counted, not "one medal for all the team", as usual. Because there were people from different sports societies in one team.

References

Sources
  – for medal stats by republic and by sports society

Nations at the 1976 Summer Olympics
1976
Summer Olympics